Batrachorhina flavoapicalis is a species of beetle in the family Cerambycidae. It was described by Stephan von Breuning in 1970. It is known from Nigeria.

References

Endemic fauna of Nigeria
Batrachorhina
Beetles described in 1970